The N-Gage is a PDA that combined features of a cell phone and a handheld game console developed and designed by Nokia, released on October 7, 2003. The following lists contains all of the known games released for the N-Gage, as well as unreleased games.

Originally announced on November 4, 2002, the N-Gage competed against its rival, the Game Boy Advance, by integrating mobile phone functionalities but it was unsuccessful due to the button layout that was primarily designed for a phone not being suitable for gaming and its resemblance to a taco when used for phone calls, leading to the origin of its mocking "Taco phone" nickname. On May 26, 2004, Nokia introduced the N-Gage QD as a redesign that fixed widely criticized issues and design problems of the original model, however, it was unable to make an impact. Both models were commercial failures, approximately selling only 3 million units combined and the platform was discontinued on November 26, 2005.

Only 58 of the games developed for the system received a North American retail release, with two retail releases being exclusive for PAL territories. However, a few titles only saw release through either digital distribution or bundles that came inside a MMC movie card. In addition, one more game came with the system on CD-ROM that was later made available for Symbian S60v2 cell phones.

Games 
There are  officially released N-Gage games on this list.

Cancelled games 
A number of games were either announced or already in development before ultimately being cancelled.

See also 
 Lists of video games

Notes

References

External links 
 List of N-Gage games at MobyGames

N-Gage